James Charles Brady (born January 21, 1876 in Dublin, Ireland-died January 24, 1962) was a Canadian politician, school principal and teacher. He was elected to the House of Commons of Canada as a Member of the Conservative Party to represent the riding of Skeena. He was defeated in the 1930 election.

External links
 

1876 births
1962 deaths
Irish emigrants to Canada (before 1923)
Conservative Party of Canada (1867–1942) MPs
Members of the House of Commons of Canada from British Columbia
Politicians from County Dublin